Achille Petrocelli (born August 18, 1861 or December 30, 1862) was an Italian painter, mainly of genre themes of his native Naples.

He was the son of painter Vincenzo, and younger brother of painter Arturo Petrocelli. He first studied under his father. He won a prize for a landscape at an exhibition at the Institute of Fine Arts of Naples, where he was mentored by Gabriele Smargiassi and Achille Carrillo. Among the works of Achille are: Dimmi di sì (large canvas with figures painted from life); Tutto per i figli (Neapolitan genre scene, exhibited at the Promotrice of Naples; Riposo dei lavoratori; and Le odalische (large canvas with figures painted from life). He also painted many portraits, including marchese Rafa.

References

1861 births
1896 deaths
19th-century Italian painters
Italian male painters
Italian genre painters
Painters from Naples
19th-century Italian male artists